New Providence Presbyterian Church is a historic Presbyterian church located at Brownsburg, Rockbridge County, Virginia. It was built in 1859, and is a monumental, one-story Greek Revival style brick building. Rev. Robert Lewis Dabney (1820-1898) may have had a hand in the design of New Providence. The front facade features a central recessed portico marked by slightly projecting flanking piers and a similarly projecting pediment supported on two massive, unfluted Doric order columns.  In 1926 a three-story, brick Sunday School wing was added to the rear.

It was listed on the National Register of Historic Places in 1980.

References

19th-century Presbyterian church buildings in the United States
Presbyterian churches in Virginia
Churches on the National Register of Historic Places in Virginia
Greek Revival church buildings in Virginia
Churches completed in 1859
Buildings and structures in Rockbridge County, Virginia
National Register of Historic Places in Rockbridge County, Virginia
1859 establishments in Virginia